Nick Duncombe (21 January 1982 – 14 February 2003) was an English rugby union footballer who played for Harlequins and England. Earmarked as a promising youngster since his time in the England youth teams, Duncombe was the England senior team's youngest debutant scrum-half at the time of his debut and won two international caps before his death at age 21.

Biography
Duncombe attended the Royal Grammar School, High Wycombe, which was renowned for its rugby tradition. At school, he excelled in various sports including cricket and football and began playing for the England national youth teams and England Schoolboys. A neck injury he sustained during an England youth game in 2000 nearly ended his career but he recovered.

Career
Duncombe initially played for the Saracens' youth squads before joining Harlequins. He made his professional debut in 2002.

On 2 February 2002 Clive Woodward gave Duncombe his England début as a half-time replacement for the injured scrum-half Kyran Bracken against Scotland at Murrayfield.  Selection came after having played just 270 minutes of senior rugby for Harlequins' first XV – and just 12 days after his 20th birthday - making him England's youngest scrum half of the professional era.  He earned his second cap in the next fixture against Ireland on 16 February 2002.

Besides the 15-a-side version, Duncombe also represented England in sevens at the 2002 Commonwealth Games.

Death
Duncombe contracted meningitis while on what has erroneously been described as a warm-weather training trip to Spain with his club Harlequins. In reality, it was a short break, to Lanzarote, with his club colleague, Nathan Williams.

Dan Luger, another established England international, was also due to be on the trip with Duncombe, but was called into the England squad to play France at Twickenham.

A statue of Nick is displayed at Harlequins Twickenham home, The Stoop. On the front of the statue, the plinth reads: 

Nick Duncombe, 1982 - 2003. 
Harlequins & England.
'Carpe Diem' (Latin for: 'Seize the Day').

References

External links 
 Tribute to Nick Duncombe
 The Schools' Rugby Website, Player of the Tournamanet at the St Joseph's Festival
 Fansite tribute
 Harlequins press release archived on fansite

1982 births
2003 deaths
Deaths from meningitis
England international rugby union players
English rugby union players
People educated at the Royal Grammar School, High Wycombe
Rugby union scrum-halves
Neurological disease deaths in Spain
Infectious disease deaths in Spain